Susan Erica Fear  (18 March 1963 – 28 May 2006) was an Australian mountain climber, supporter of the Fred Hollows Foundation and a 2005 recipient of the Order of Australia Medal. Her life and climbing career is illustrated in her biography Fear No Boundary: The Road to Everest and Beyond, written by fellow climber Lincoln Hall and Fear, published in 2005.

Early life 
Fear was born on 18 March 1963 in St Ives, New South Wales, Australia, she was the middle child in her family, with two brothers Grahame and John. Her parents were Ron and Joan Fear. Her mother Joan died from breast cancer in May 1988, and her father Ron died unexpectedly of a heart attack in June 2002.

Fear attended St Ives North Public School in her primary school years where she was the School Captain, and later attended Abbotsleigh (Years 7–10) where she was the softball captain, and Barker College (Years 11–12) on Sydney's north where she was a school prefect and the captain of the girls' hockey and cricket teams. While at school she attained the Duke of Edinburgh's Gold Award. Sue was recently (2019) honoured when Barker College, extending their number of 'Houses' to cater for the influx of many more girls in Years 7-9, named one house after her (Fear House).

After leaving school after Year 12 in 1980 Fear took an office job with Wilderness Expeditions, an adventure travel company founded by Tim Macartney-Snape. That company was later acquired by World Expeditions, and she moved out of the office and into the field. She became an adventure guide and led cross country ski trips in Australia as well as treks in Africa, South America, and Asia. She was recognized as one of the company's senior guides, leading many physically challenging mountaineering expeditions.

Climbing career 
Between 1997 and 2006, Fear climbed five of the world's fourteen 8,000 metre peaks, or eight-thousanders.  Her climbing career took off in 1997 when she led the first successful ascent by an Australian team of Makalu II (7,680 m) in Nepal.  She followed this with ascents of Cho Oyu (8,201 m) in 1998, and Shishapangma (8,046 m) in 2002. In 2003, Fear climbed Everest (8,848 m) from the more difficult Tibetan side on the North Col. She was the first Australian-born woman and the second Australian woman overall to do so. She then successfully summitted Gasherbrum II (8,035 m) in Pakistan the following year (2004). Her final climb was to Manaslu (8,156 m) in 2006, which she successfully summited.

Fear died on 28 May 2006, when she fell into a crevasse (approx. 7,800 m) while descending from the summit of Manaslu in Nepal. Manaslu was her fifth climb of a mountain over 8,000 metres.  Her body remains on the mountain, honouring an earlier request if she were to die while climbing a mountain. A plaque now lies in the memory of her just above the town of Bandipur on a small hill facing Manaslu.

Honours and awards 
Fear was awarded the Order of Australia Medal (OAM) in 2005 for her work as Ambassador for The Fred Hollows Foundation and for services to mountaineering, which will have an eye clinic named after her in Dhading Besi, Nepal. Fear was also named the 2003 Adventurer of the Year by the Australian Geographic Society. She was an ambassador for the Australian Himalayan Foundation and also helped raise funds for the Australian Nepalese Medical Group.

Book 
Fear's life and climbing career is written about in the biographical book Fear No Boundary: The Road to Everest and Beyond, written by fellow climber Lincoln Hall (with Sue Fear), and first published in Melbourne by Lothian Books in 2005.

References

External links 
 Sydney Morning Herald - Top climber is dead: officials
 Sydney Morning Herald - Exploring the not so lonely planet

Australian mountain climbers
1963 births
2006 deaths
Mountaineering deaths
Sport deaths in Nepal
Australian summiters of Mount Everest
People educated at Abbotsleigh
People educated at Barker College
Female climbers